Red River Expedition can refer to different historical events:
Wolseley Expedition, in Canada (1870)
Red River Expedition (1804), by the United States to explore the American West
Red River Expedition (1806), by the United States to explore the American West
Red River Expedition (1852), in the State of Texas
Red River Expedition (1856), by the U.S. Army in the future State of Minnesota
Red River Campaign, during the American Civil War